Café de Paris was an American musical variety show broadcast on the DuMont Television Network. The 15-minute program ran on Mondays, Wednesdays, and Fridays from January 17. 1949, to March 4, 1949.

Premise  
Singer Sylvie St. Claire was the host of a Paris nightclub that she inherited. She hired the Stan Free Trio to perform in the club, after which she obtained a contract for TV broadcasts, which provided funds to keep the club in operation.

None of the episodes are known to survive.

See also
List of programs broadcast by the DuMont Television Network
List of surviving DuMont Television Network broadcasts

References

Bibliography
David Weinstein, The Forgotten Network: DuMont and the Birth of American Television (Philadelphia: Temple University Press, 2004) 
Alex McNeil, Total Television, Fourth edition (New York: Penguin Books, 1980) 
Tim Brooks and Earle Marsh, The Complete Directory to Prime Time Network TV Shows, Third edition (New York: Ballantine Books, 1964)

External links

DuMont historical website

DuMont Television Network original programming
1940s American variety television series
1949 American television series debuts
1949 American television series endings
Black-and-white American television shows
English-language television shows
Lost television shows